Pilies Street (literally, "Castle Street") is one of the main streets in the Old Town of Vilnius, the capital of Lithuania. It is a rather short street, running from Cathedral Square to the Town Hall Square.

Out of several locations across Vilnius used by market traders to sell the wares of folk artists, Pilies Street is the most popular. It has a natural advantage over the Town Hall Square as the street is generally busy and less likely to be interrupted by the political or cultural events commonly held at the Town Hall. Many people visit the street to buy gifts at Christmas or before going abroad to visit friends. The market is also popular with souvenir hunters. Souvenir shops offer amberware and amber jewelry as well as linen clothes. The street is also known for the Kaziukas Fair, when folk artists from all four corners of Lithuania gather here to display and sell their latest merchandise.

Festivals in Vilnius frequently take place on Pilies Street – most processions will make their way through here at some point. This is true whatever the festival – be it Christmas, Easter, the day of Restoration of Independence, or just a spontaneous celebration following a major win for the Lithuanian basketball team. 
The headquarters of Vilnius University are located between Pilies Street and University Street,. The House of the Signatories where the Declaration of Independence was signed on February 16, 1918 is also located on this street.

References

Streets in Vilnius